Paramita was a pop rock act in the Philippines that played their own brand of music from 2005 to 2013. Paramita was made up of Marco De Leon on guitars (replacing Norman Dellosa), Alsey Cortez on bass, and Ria Bautista on drums and vocals. Paramita have released three several albums in its career.

History

In 2005, they released their first single "Hiling" under Vicor Records which placed them on the map. It was included in the 10-track full-length album entitled Tala. Six of the album's songs are written in English while four are in Tagalog. Their second album was self-titled Paramita which was released in 2008 under Terno Recordings.

Despite being such a young band, Paramita has already been featured in several media sources, such as MTV Ink magazine, the Philippine Daily Inquirer, NU 107's In The Raw radio program and the ABS-CBN morning show Breakfast. Paramita is fast becoming one of the most solid independent acts in the scene today, enlightened by music and strengthened by a belief in their own unique talents. By 2010, they decided to go fully independent under Blaster Music (an independent music organization) and launched their third album named Liyab. Their song "Turbulence" was on NU107.7 Stairway to Seven and was no. 1 for 12 weeks on UR105.9 Underground Radio. Their songs "Sulyap" and "Nightingale" received airplay on local stations.

Paramita is now with Blaster Music along with Reklamo and upcoming artists Odat, Penguin, Trapeze, and Eleyn.

Break-up

In the 10th day of October 2013, Paramita announced its disbanding and their future plans as individual artists and musicians on the group's Facebook page.

Band members
Marco De Leon – rhythm guitar
Alsey Cortez – co-vocals, bass guitar
Ria Bautista – drums, lead vocals

Former members

Norman Dellosa – lead guitar
Jeremy Lacorte - rhythm guitar
 Paolo Legaspi - bass

Discography

Studio albums
Tala – 2005 Vicor Music Corporation
Paramita – 2008 Terno Recordings
Liyab – 2010 Blaster Records

Collaboration albums
 Kami nAPO Muna Ulit (2007, Universal)

Awards and nominations

References
Notes

Bibliography
Paramita on Soundclick.com

Filipino rock music groups
Musical groups established in 2002
Musical groups disestablished in 2013
Musical groups from Manila